Plaisance is a commune in the Plaisance Arrondissement, in the Nord departmentof Haiti. It has 50,367 inhabitants.

Morne Bedoret is a nearby peak which is 543 m high. Fort Bedourete was here.

References

Populated places in Nord (Haitian department)
Communes of Haiti